Samuel Cheetham may refer to:

 Samuel Cheetham (footballer) (born 1896), English professional footballer
 Samuel Cheetham (priest) (1827–1908), Anglican priest